Al-Walīd ibn Ubaidillah Al-Buḥturī (821–97 AD; 206–84 AH) was an Arab poet born at Manbij in Islamic Syria, between Aleppo and the Euphrates. Like Abū Tammām, he was of the tribe of Tayy, from the Buhturids.

Biography
While still young, al-Buḥturī visited Abū Tammām at Homs, on whose recommendation the authorities at Ma'arrat an-Nu'man awarded al-Buḥturī an annual pension of 4000 dirhams. Later he went to Baghdād, where he wrote verses in praise of the caliph al-Mutawakkil and of the members of his court. Although long resident in Baghdād, he devoted much of his poetry to the praise of Aleppo, and his love-poetry dedicated to a girl, Aiwa, of that city. He died at Manbij in 897.

He was often compared with the famous poet Abu Tammâm, who was his contemporary and mentor. The poems of al-Buhturî are examples of the classical style in Arabic poetry. He worked as a panegyrist to make a living and gained fame with his panegyrics.

His dīwan  (collected poetry) was edited and published twice in the 10th century. First by Abū Bakr al-Ṣūlī, in the section of whose book Kitāb Al-Awrāq (كتاب الاوراق) on Muḥadathūn (modern poets), al-Buḥturī is included among a group of fourteen poets whose dīwans al-Ṣūlī edited and arranged alphabetically according to the final consonant in each line. The second editor arranged his dīwan according to subject (1883, Istanbul). Like Abu Tammam, he made a collection of early poems also known as the Hamasah. These collections of poems are also known as Diwans.

References

820s births
897 deaths
Poets from the Abbasid Caliphate
9th-century Arabic poets
Tayy
9th-century people from the Abbasid Caliphate
People from Manbij District
History of Aleppo
9th-century Arabs